Mimosybra postlineata is a species of beetle in the family Cerambycidae. It was described by Hüdepohl in 1995.

References

Mimosybra
Beetles described in 1995